The 1901 Purdue Boilermakers football team was an American football team that represented Purdue University during the 1901 Western Conference football season. The Boilermakers compiled a 4–4–1 record and outscored their opponents by a total of 138 to 66 in their fourth, non-consecutive season under head coach D. M. Balliet. John F. G. Miller was the team captain.

Schedule

References

Purdue
Purdue Boilermakers football seasons
Purdue Boilermakers football